The North Kaibab Trail is a hiking trail in the North Rim side of the Grand Canyon, in Grand Canyon National Park, located in the U.S. state of Arizona.

Access
Access to this part of the park by car is seasonal, open from mid-May to mid-October or depending on snow cover from the previous winter.

It is possible to reach the North Kaibab Trailhead by crossing the canyon on foot from the South Rim or by snowshoe or cross-country ski beginning at Jacob Lake, Arizona.

Description

The North Kaibab Trail begins at the head of Roaring Springs canyon and ends at the Colorado River.

The Ken Patrick Trail and Uncle Jim Trail are also accessible from this parking area. 

Treated water is available seasonally at the Supai Tunnel, Roaring Springs, the Caretaker's Dwelling, and Cottonwood Campground; and year-round at Bright Angel Campground and Phantom Ranch. Features along the trail include Roaring Springs, Ribbon Falls (140 ft), The Box (a slot canyon), and Phantom Ranch.

Part of Arizona Trail
The North Kaibab Trail is also part of the Arizona Trail system, crossing the state of Arizona from Mexico to Utah.  The trail is joined by South Kaibab Trail which is located to the south of the trail.

Condition
Grand Canyon National Park categorizes the North Kaibab Trail as a corridor trail.  With this designation it receives regular maintenance and patrols by park rangers.

Camping
Hikers may only camp at the Bright Angel or Cottonwood Campgrounds, where they can stay overnight with a permit issued by the Grand Canyon National Park Backcountry Information Center. Use of the campground overnight is regulated by the National Park Service, and they call for a maximum number of groups (7 to 11 people) and parties (1 to 6 people), as well as a maximum total number of persons.

Use permits are available on a first-come, first-served basis from the park's Backcountry Information Center. Requests are taken beginning on the first day of the month, up to four months before the requested first night of camping.

Hazards
Hazards hikers can encounter along the North Kaibab Trail include dehydration, sudden rainstorms, flash flooding, loose footing, rockfall, encounters with wildlife, and extreme heat.  At the Colorado River, additional hazards include hypothermia (due to the river's consistently cold temperatures), trauma (due to collisions with boulders in rapids), and drowning.

See also
List of trails in Grand Canyon National Park

References

External links
 Official  Grand Canyon National Park website
 Grand Canyon Explorer

Grand Canyon, North Rim
Hiking trails in Grand Canyon National Park
National Recreation Trails in Arizona